The Second Fisher ministry (Australian Labor Party) was the 8th ministry of the Government of Australia. It was led by the country's 5th Prime Minister, Andrew Fisher. The Second Fisher ministry succeeded the Third Deakin ministry, which dissolved on 29 April 1910 following the federal election that took place on 13 April which saw Labor defeat the Alfred Deakin's Liberal Party. It is the first federal government in Australian history to be elected with a majority in the House of Representatives, as well as the first majority national Labor government in the world. The ministry was replaced by the Cook ministry on 24 June 1913 following the federal election that took place in May which saw the Liberals defeat Labor.

King O'Malley, who died in 1953, was the last surviving member of the Second Fisher ministry; O'Malley was also the last surviving member of the First Hughes ministry.

Ministry

References

Ministries of Edward VII
Ministries of George V
Fisher, 2
Australian Labor Party ministries
1910 establishments in Australia
1913 disestablishments in Australia
Cabinets established in 1910
Cabinets disestablished in 1913